{{DISPLAYTITLE:C18H25N}}
The molecular formula C18H25N (molar mass: 255.40 g/mol, exact mass: 255.1987 u) may refer to:

 Dimemorfan, or 3,17-dimethylmorphinan, a cough suppressant of the morphinan family
 Volazocine, an opioid analgesic of the benzomorphan class which was never marketed